In African drumming, the title of master drummer is given to a drummer who is well known by other masters for their high skill and knowledge. It is a title passed down from a master to their pupil, after they have learned all there is to know about the African drum.

In general, a master drummer has given their whole life to the djembe and dunun. They are able to play any part of any rhythm for their ethnic group and neighbouring ethnic groups, in any ceremonial situation. They also know the songs and dances that go with each rhythm.  A drummer can play for twenty years before he or she is given the status of 'Master'.

Another type of master drummer is a person who leads other drummers in playing drum rhythms, e.g. in the French Caribbean styles, the master drummer may be called "kamande" in French Creole.

The master drummer can also lead the other drummers through a well known dance.

List of master drummers
Some well-known master drummers include:
 Bolokada Conde
 Soungalo Coulibaly
 Mare Sanogo
 Babatunde Olatunji
 Abdoulaye Diakité
 Yamadu Bani Dunbia
 Mamady Keïta
 Mustapha Tettey Addy
 Famoudou Konaté
 Drissa Kone
 Okyerema Asante
 Doudou N'Diaye Rose
 Sikiru Adepoju
 Amadou Kienou

Disambiguation
The term "master drummer" may also refer to an African live composer.

References

Drummers
African drums